John Michael "Mick" Bednarek is a retired United States Army officer. He was chief of the United States Office of Security Cooperation in Iraq and former commander of the United States First Army. Bednarek took command of the First Army on April 6, 2011, from Lieutenant General Thomas G. Miller and was succeeded as commanding officer by Major General Kevin R. Wendel on March 14, 2013 (interim), with Lieutenant General Michael S. Tucker succeeding Bednarek as permanent commander on August 2, 2013.

Military career
Bednarek received his commission through an Army Reserve Officers' Training Corps program upon his graduation from Old Dominion University. He has held commands within every level of the Army, ranging from platoon to field army. Bednarek has also served as the Chief of the Training Group at the Joint Warfighting Center, the Chief of the Operations Group at the Joint Readiness Training Center, and Commander of the 4th Training Brigade. In June 2008 Bednarek was given command of the First Army's East Division and on April 6, 2011, Bednarek took command of the United States First Army. He served as commander of the First Army until March 14, 2013, when he was assigned as Chief of the Office of Security Cooperation (OSC) in Iraq. As OSC chief, Bednarek was the highest ranking American military officer in Iraq and was involved in US efforts against the Islamic State in the Iraqi Civil War. Bednarek has also attended Troy State University where he received a MS in personnel management and administration, the US Army Command and General Staff College, and the US Army War College. Bednarek retired from service on July 24, 2015.

Awards and decorations

References

Year of birth missing (living people)
Living people
Old Dominion University alumni
Troy University alumni
United States Army generals
Recipients of the Defense Superior Service Medal
British emigrants to the United States
Recipients of the Legion of Merit